Cuddalore Nagarathinam Pandurangan (1912 – 1975) was a noted music director who had scored music for Tamil, Kannada, Telugu and Sinhala movies. C. N. Pandurangan was an Indian music director who worked mainly in South Indian films.

Early life
Cuddalore Nagarathinam Pandurangan (CNP) was born in 1912. His father was holding a Government post, conducted religious discourses and was also an exponent of Harikatha. CNP commenced his music lessons under his father and accompanied him on the stage. He was later put under the tutelage of Chittoor Subramaniam Pillai (The same vocalist who taught Madurai Somu).

Career
CNP became a veena exponent and was spotted by K. Subramaniam who engaged CNP for his productions. CNP's first assignment as a music composer was the 1948 Sinhalese movie Kapati Arakshakaya directed by K. Subramaniam. The movie was a runaway hit and CNP's compositions sung by the famous Eddie Jayamane and Rukmani Devi became very popular. This led to CNP composing the songs for a few more Sinhalese movies in later years such as Veradunu Kurumanama, Amma, Sihinaya and Devasundari. Vembathur Krishnan mentioned working with CNP in reverential terms.

The first Tamil movie which had songs composed by CNP was Kamavalli (1948). Despite some good classical songs written by Papanasam Sivan and rendered by Nagercoil Mahadevan and S. Varalakshmi. Even though CNP was not flooded with offers, he carried on in Tamil movies till 1978. He also composed music for Telugu movies where most of them are Tamil-Telugu bilingual movies.

He worked in Kannada movie too such as Bhakta Mallikarjuna (1955), Kacha Devayani (1956), Devasundari (1962). Later Sri Purandaradasaru (1967) based on the legendary saint-composer which had singers such as M. L. Vasanthakumari, M. Balamuralikrishna, P. B. Srinivas and S. Janaki.

Composer Vedha worked as his associate for some years and learned the nuances of music composition before branching off on his own. Pukazhenthi worked under him for a few years, before teaming up with K. V. Mahadevan. Shyam commenced his film career as a violinist under him. B. A. Chidambaranath was part of his troupe.

Shyam mentioned that unlike the other composers who would compose playing the harmonium, CNP would play the notes on the veena and sing the tune. He could come up with 5 to 6 tunes for every song and the directors would sit mesmerized, spoilt for choice. His assistant Munuswamy would then play each segment on the harmonium to the instrumentalists. CNP shared a very good rapport with all the great lyricists and singers of the time. He used to encourage the lyricists to come out with appropriate, poetic lines and would not hesitate to amend the tune to accentuate the beauty of the lyrics. CNP was also very particular about the choice of singers, Shyam recalled, and each song would go the singer who CNP thought could do it the best justice. CNP would escort all his troupe members to Harrisons and treat them to a sumptuous meal at his own expense. Sham recalls CNP as A great artiste and A great human being.

CNP worked with G. Ramanathan in Pudhu Vazhvu and with Viswanathan–Ramamoorthy in Pona Machaan Thirumbi Vandhan. He also collaborated with Meenakshi Subramaniam in Kacha Devayani (Kannada) and Pandithevan (Tamil).

He worked with singers like T. M. Soundararajan, A. M. Rajah, Seerkazhi Govindarajan, Thiruchi Loganathan, C. S. Jayaraman, V. N. Sundharam, P. B. Sreenivas, S. C. Krishnan, T. A. Mothi, K. R Chellamuthu, A. L. Raghavan, M. Balamuralikrishna, S. V. Ponnusamy, K. M. Mani Rajan, M. L. Vasanthakumari, P. A. Periyanayaki, P. Leela, Jikki, T. V. Rathnam, A. P. Komala, K. Jamuna Rani, P. Suseela, Radha Jayalakshmi, A. G. Rathnamala, Soolamangalam Jeyalakshmi, Soolamangalam Rajalakshmi, K. V. Janaki, K. Rani, G. Kasthoori, S. Janaki, and L. R. Eswari.

The singing actors T. R. Mahalingam, K. R. Ramasamy, S. Varalakshmi, V. Nagayya, B. Jayamma, N. S. Krishnan, T. A. Madhuram, P. S. Govindhan, C. S. Pandiyan and J. P. Chandrababu also sang memorable songs under his compositions.

Style
CNP only composed music for less than 40 movies spread over a period of 30 years. Many of them are collaboration with other composers where he had only a handful of songs to compose himself. Even though many of the movies were commercial failures, yet CNP shows his erudite classical roots, technical finesse, inventive arrangements, uncanny grasp of the mood and sequence and astute pick of a variety of singers.

Works
Some compositions of C. N. Pandurangan, include:
 Manmohanadass Gandhi from Geetha Gandhi by P. A. Periyanayaki
 Good Luck! Good Luck from En Thangai by C.S. Pandiyan & A. G. Rathnamala
 Aadum Oonjalai Pole from En Thangai by T. A. Mothi & P. Leela
 Aasai Roja Paaru from Ragasiya Penn 117 by Soolamangalam Rajalakshmi
 Sirpi Sedhukkaadha Porchilaiye from Edhir Paradhathu by Jikki
 Sirpi Sedhukkaadha Porchilaiye from Edhir Paradhathu by A. M. Rajah
 Singara Roopa Karunaa from Mamiyar by S. Varalakshmi
 Dance Baby Dance from Gumastha by M. L. Vasanthakumari
 Jeeva Gaana Veena Naan from Bhoologa Rambai by P. Suseela
 Naanaada Nee Paadu Kannaa from Mala Oru Mangala Vilakku by Soolamangalam Rajalakshmi
 Naan Paada Nee Aadu Kanne from Mala Oru Mangala Vilakku by P. B. Srinivas
 Chandi Miranda Kaadu Kollaadhu from Pandithevan by S. Janaki
 Nee Aadinaal Oor Aadidum from Pandithevan by J. P. Chandrababu & K. Jamuna Rani
 Inbama Kondadum from Indira En Selvam by P. B. Srinivas & K. Rani
 Kanni Paruvam Aval from Indira En Selvam by P. B. Srinivas & Soolamangalam Rajalakshmi

CNP has worked with Radha Jayalakshmi in almost all of his compositions which brings the best out of her .
Some of the songs are:
 Jegam Ezhum Neeye from Edhir Paradhathu, solo
 Kannalar Ingu Varuvaar from Bhoologa Rambai, solo
 Aasai Nenjame from Bhoologa Rambai with A. M. Rajah
 Kanavu Ninaivaagum from Menaka, solo
 Thellathelindha Thenamudhe from Indira En Selvam, solo
 Anbaana Mozhi Pesum from Solaimalai Raani with A. M. Rajah
 Annai Nee En Vaazhvile from Mala Oru Mangala Vilakku, solo
 Kannum Karuthum from Pandithevan with S. Janaki & K. Rani
 Aadhaaram Nin Paadham Ambigaiye from Pona Machaan Thirumbi Vandhan, solo
 Kottu Melam Kovililm from Pudhu Vazhvu, solo

Personal life
CNP and his wife Tarabai had 6 children. One of his sons, Mohanarangan was a famed flautist. CNP passed away in 1975 at the age of 63.

Filmography

References

Tamil film score composers
Telugu film score composers
Indian male film score composers